Antoine Wagner (born Antoine Amadeus Wagner-Pasquier; 1982) is an American-French visual artist. He works between Woodstock, NY and Paris, France. Through a visual language drawn from nature his work refers to mythological narratives and the sublime.

Early life and education
Wagner was born in Evanston, Illinois. He is the son of German opera manager Eva Wagner-Pasquier and is the great-great-grandson of the composer Richard Wagner. He graduated from Northwestern University, Illinois, and Sciences Po, Paris, with a double bachelor's degree in Theatre and Political Science in 2005.

He continued his education in film at the School of Continuing and Professional Studies at New York University's Tisch School of the Arts in 2007.

Artwork
Wagner's medium include video, sound, sculpture, performance and photography, which he exhibits through installations, site-specific projects, film, monumental photography and opera. Through the visual language of nature, his work references music, mythology and the romantic.

Wagner's multifaceted practice has created an entire visual language to engage the audience in communicating with nature. Abstract unseen anthropomorphic shapes found in nature and minerals are the main actors of this world of mythologies and cyclical redundancies. Through different medium and projects, the artist examines the themes of identity, geography and spirituality and offers to the viewer an escape from traditional geographic and artistic boundaries.

Through his exhibitions including Exil (Museum am Rothenbaum, 2013), Kundry (La Filature de Mulhouse 2015), Wagner applied his experience in the moving image to photography, exploring the possibilities of narrative in a silent and motionless environment through large-scale abstract photography.

In 2018, Wagner directed Act II of the Opera Die Walkure at Frank Gehry's New World Center in Miami.

Wagner's site-specific multimedia installation Sentimental Analysis (April 2019) is a response to the legend of Ara the Beautiful at The National Gallery of Armenia.

Early work

In 2006, Wagner assisted director Michael Haneke on Funny Games.

After his first site specific installation Lisz[:T:]raumin in Raiding, Austria in 2007 he directed a series of videos and documentaries exploring visual inspiration in music. His film From a Mess to the Masses (2011) reveals the genesis of visual creation of the band Phoenix.

Wagner: A genius in Exile (2013) is a documentary revealing the landscapes that influenced Richard Wagner during his Swiss exile.

In 2013, VfmK Verlag für moderne Kunst published Wagner in der Schweiz, a photographic essay exploring Richard Wagner's inspiration during his forced journey from Germany to Switzerland after the 1848 revolution. It was awarded the 2013 Prix de l'Académie Lyrique Pierre Bergé in Paris.

Exhibitions

2009: The Open, Group Show, Deitch Projects, New York City.
2011: Landscapes Escaped: Henn Gallerie, Munich, Germany.
2013–2016: Exil, The Opera Bastille, Paris, 2013; The Bayreuth Festspielhaus, Germany, 2013; Palazzo Vendramin, Venice, Italy, 2013; Museum für Völkerkunde Hamburg, Hamburg, Germany, 2015; Gertrude Salon, New York, 2016; Stedelijk Museum Breda, Breda, Netherlands, 2016;
2015: Cadences: La Filature, Mulhouse, France.
2015: Wagner in der Schweiz (screening), Goethe-Institut, California, United States.
2016: Un Musee Imaginaire, Group Show, Collection Lambert (Collection Lambert), Avignon, France.
2016: Common Denominator, Theater St. Gallen, St. Gallen, Switzerland.
2016: Bredaphoto, Stedelijk Museum Breda, Breda, Netherlands.
2016: Interference, Galerie RM, Paris.
2017: Kundry, La Filature de Mulhouse, France. 
2017: Supersonic, Deck, Singapore.
2017: Echo, Julien David, Jinguamae, Tokyo.
2017: Silence, Atelier Hermes Pantin, France.
2017: Wagner in der Schweiz, Society of the Four Arts, Palm Beach, Florida.
2017: Art Paris Art Fair, Grand Palais, Paris.
2017: Distortion, Youngfu, Shanghai, China
2017: Antoine Wagner, Phillips, Paris
2017: Julierpass, Tait memorial Fundwith Stuart Skelton, Saint Paul's Church, London
2018: Liquid La patinoire, Royal Gallerie Valerie Bach, Bruxelles
2018: Looking at sound: Symposium at the Goethe Institut, Tokyo
2018: Studies Between Silence: Nancy Nasher, Soluna Music and Arts Festival, Dallas, Texas
2018: ACT II - Die Walkure, New World Center, Miami
2018: Orient Blue, In Cadaques Festival, Cadaques, Spain
2018: Artist talk, Spring Place, New York
2018 Morceau Choisi, (group show), Bubenberg Art Paris
2019: Conscience of Angel's Landing, Art Paris, Grand Palais Paris,
2019: Sentimental Analysis, site specific multimedia exhibition at the National Gallery of Armenia

Collections

Wagner's work is held in the following permanent collections:
Yvon Lambert Gallery, Paris
Museum of Ethnology, Hamburg, Hamburg, Germany

Filmography

Wagner assisted director Michael Haneke on his American remake of Funny Games in 2007.

In 2011, Wagner directed the film From a Mess to the Masses featuring the band Phoenix. The film was commissioned by Arte and first broadcast in 2011.

Wagner has directed videos featuring Julien David, Phoenix, Vanessa Paradis, Johnny Hallyday, Kate Moss, Maria Korchetkova, and Spank Rock.

Wagner has also worked as a cinematographer.

Residencies

Wagner has completed residencies at Robert Wilson's Byrd Hoffman Watermill Center, NY (2005), and at The Villa Medici, Rome (2014).

Publications
Wagner: A Genius in Exile (2013)
Antoine Wagner: Wagner in der Schweiz (2014). Nürnberg, Moderne Kunst Nürnberg. 
Antoine Wagner: Kundry (2015). Gourcuff Grandenigo, Montreuil. . With texts by Eric Mezil and Carole Blumenfeld.
Patrice Chéreau: An Imaginary Museum (2016). Arles: Actes Sud. P. 71–74. 
You (2016). .

Ancestry

Wagner, is the great-great-grandson of German composer Richard Wagner, and great-great-great-grandson of Franz Liszt.

See also
Wagner family tree

References

External links

Photography Now Profile

Northwestern University alumni
Tisch School of the Arts alumni
Sciences Po alumni
Living people
1982 births
Artists from Evanston, Illinois
American male sculptors
Photographers from Illinois
21st-century American photographers
21st-century American sculptors
Draughtsmen
American multimedia artists
American video artists
American installation artists
Sculptors from Illinois